Sa'ar 72 is a new class of Israeli Navy corvettes designed by Israel Shipyards Ltd. as an improved and stretched .  The first Sa'ar 72 was expected to become operational in 2015. Subsequent vessels were planned to enter service at the rate of one every eight months.

History
The design was first unveiled at the International Maritime Defence Exhibition (IMDEX) Asia in Singapore in May 2013.

See also
 Sa'ar 62 class offshore patrol vessel
 Sa'ar 4-class missile boat
 Sa'ar 4.5-class missile boat
 Sa'ar 5-class corvette
 Israeli Navy

References

Corvette classes
Proposed ships
Proposed weapons of Israel